Wang Zhiwei (born 18 July 1988) is a Chinese sport shooter who competes in the men's pistol. At the 2012 Summer Olympics in Beijing, he won the bronze medal in the men's 50 metre pistol.

References

1988 births
Chinese male sport shooters
Shooters at the 2012 Summer Olympics
Olympic shooters of China
Olympic medalists in shooting
Medalists at the 2012 Summer Olympics
Olympic bronze medalists for China
Shooters at the 2014 Asian Games
Asian Games medalists in shooting
Sport shooters from Shanxi
People from Jinzhong
Living people
Shooters at the 2016 Summer Olympics
Universiade medalists in shooting
Asian Games gold medalists for China
Asian Games silver medalists for China
Asian Games bronze medalists for China
Medalists at the 2014 Asian Games
Universiade silver medalists for China
Universiade bronze medalists for China
21st-century Chinese people